The Eagle is a 1925 American silent drama film directed by Clarence Brown and starring Rudolph Valentino, Vilma Bánky, and Louise Dresser. Based on the posthumously published 1841 novel Dubrovsky by Alexander Pushkin, the film is about a lieutenant in the Russian army who catches the eye of Czarina Catherine II. After he rejects her advances and flees, she puts out a warrant for his arrest, dead or alive. When he learns that his father has been persecuted and killed, he dons a black mask and becomes an outlaw. Black Eagle does not exist in the novel and was inspired by the performance of Douglas Fairbanks as Zorro in The Mark of Zorro.

Plot
Vladimir Dubrovsky (Valentino), a Lieutenant serving in the Imperial Guard of the Russian army, comes to the notice of the Czarina (Louise Dresser) when he rescues Mascha (Vilma Bánky), a beautiful young lady, and her aunt trapped in a runaway stagecoach. He is delighted when the Czarina offers to make him a general, but horrified when she tries to seduce him.  He flees and the Czarina puts a price on his head.

Soon afterwards, he receives a letter from his father informing him that the evil nobleman Kyrilla Troekouroff (James A. Marcus) has taken over his lands and is terrorizing the countryside. Hurrying home, Vladimir learns that his father has died.  Vowing to avenge his father and help the victimized peasantry, he adopts a black mask and becomes the Black Eagle, a Robin Hood figure.  Discovering that Kyrilla is Mascha's father, he takes the place of a tutor who has been sent for from France, but not previously seen by anyone in the household. Vladimir is thus able to become part of Kyrilla's household.

As Vladimir's love for Mascha grows, he becomes more and more reluctant to continue seeking revenge against her father, and the two eventually flee the Troekouroff estate.  Vladimir is captured by the Czarina's men, but the Czarina, once determined to have him executed, has a last-minute change of heart, and she allows Vladimir, given a new French name, and Mascha to leave Russia for Paris.

Cast

 Gustav von Seyffertitz as Court Servant at Dinner (uncredited)

Reception

Valentino's last few films had not been particularly well received, but The Eagle proved a strong comeback for him, gaining good reviews from the critics and a success at the box-office - although it was not as successful as his next movie, Son of the Sheik.

The Eagle is remembered for its extended tracking shot of the food-laden table in the banquet scene.

The film is recognized by American Film Institute in these lists:
 2001: AFI's 100 Years...100 Thrills – Nominated

Preservation
Prints of The Eagle currently exist in the film holdings of EmGee Film Library and in private film collections.

See also
 List of American films of 1925
 The Vigilantes Are Coming
 The Black Eagle

References

External links

Lantern slide and stills at silenthollywood.com
Stills at the Toronto Film Society website
United Artists Pressbook

1925 films
1920s adventure comedy-drama films
1920s English-language films
American adventure comedy-drama films
American silent feature films
Films directed by Clarence Brown
Films produced by Joseph M. Schenck
American black-and-white films
Films based on Russian novels
Films based on works by Aleksandr Pushkin
Films set in the 18th century
Films set in Russia
Surviving American silent films
Cultural depictions of Catherine the Great
Articles containing video clips
1925 comedy films
1925 drama films
1920s American films
Silent comedy-drama films
Silent adventure films
Silent American drama films
Silent American comedy films